The following is a list of the CHUM Chart number-one singles of 1961.

See also
1961 in music

References

1961
Canada Chum
1961 in Canadian music